David Grant (born 7 August 1966) is a former Australian rules footballer who played with St Kilda in the VFL/AFL.

Grant was a utility player and in 1991 was named on the half-back flank All Australian team. Often Grant was asked to play centre half-back in a struggling St Kilda side during the 1980s despite standing just over six-foot tall. On other occasions, Grant played as an extra forward to great affect. His aerial leap in the marking contest made him stand up against taller opponents and was a favourite of the Moorabbin faithful. Grant finished second in St Kilda's best and fairest in 1989 to Nicky Winmar and played interstate football with Tasmania. Saints fans were shocked to find out Grant was to be a part of a trade deal that would see him and Jayson Daniels sent to Sydney for Barry Mitchell and a fourth-round pick for the 1993 season. Both Grant and Mitchell refused to swap clubs and Grant stayed a further three years at St Kilda under acrimonious circumstances until he ended his career with Melbourne.

External links

Demon Wiki profile

1966 births
Living people
Australian rules footballers from Tasmania
St Kilda Football Club players
Melbourne Football Club players
South Launceston Football Club players
All-Australians (AFL)
Tasmanian Football Hall of Fame inductees
People educated at Melbourne High School
Tasmanian State of Origin players